Eun-sung, also spelled Eun-seong, or Un-sung, is a Korean unisex given name. Its meaning differs based on the hanja used to write each syllable of the name. There are 26 hanja with the reading "eun" and 27 hanja with the reading "seong" on the South Korean government's official list of hanja which may be registered for use in given names.

People with this name include:
Choi Eun-sung (born 1971), South Korean male football player 
Hong Eun-seong (born 1983), South Korean male field hockey player
Eunseong Kim (born 1971), South Korean male physicist
Lee Eun-sung (born 1988), South Korean actress
Ji Eun-sung (born 1991), South Korean actor 

Fictional characters with this name include:
Go Eun-seong, in the 2009 South Korean television series Brilliant Legacy
Ji Eun-sung, in the 2004 South Korean film He Was Cool
Cha Eun-seong, in the 2016 South Korean television series Marriage Contract

See also
List of Korean given names

References

Korean unisex given names